Militsiya was the name of the police forces in the Soviet Union (until 1991) and in several Eastern Bloc countries (1945–1992), as well as in the non-aligned SFR Yugoslavia (1945–1992). The term continues in common and sometimes official usage in some of the individual former Soviet republics such as  Belarus, Tajikistan, Uzbekistan and Kyrgyzstan, as well as in the partially recognised or unrecognised republics of Abkhazia, South Ossetia, Transnistria, DNR and LNR.

Name and status

The name militsiya as applied to police forces originates from a Russian Provisional Government decree dated April 17, 1917, and from early Soviet history: both the Provisional Government and the Bolsheviks intended to associate their new law-enforcement authority with the self-organisation of the people and to distinguish it from the czarist police. The militsiya was reaffirmed in Russia on October 28 (November 10, according to the new style dating), 1917 under the official name of the "Workers' and Peasants' Militsiya", in further contrast to what the Bolsheviks called the "bourgeois class protecting" police. Eventually, it was replaced by the Ministry of Internal Affairs (Russian: МВД, MVD; Ukrainian: МВС, MVS; Belorussian: МУС, MUS), which is now the official full name for the militsiya forces in the respective countries. Its regional branches are officially called Departments of Internal Affairs—city department of internal affairs, raion department of internal affairs, oblast department of internal affairs, etc. (The Russian term for a raion department is OVD (ОВД; Отдел/Отделение внутренних дел, Otdel/Otdeleniye vnutrennikh del), for region department is UVD (УВД; Управление внутренних дел, Upravleniye vnutrennikh del) or, sometimes, GUVD (ГУВД; Главное управление внутренних дел, Glavnoye upravleniye vnutrennikh del), same for national republics is MVD, (МВД; Министерство внутренних дел, Ministerstvo vnutrennikh del).)

Functionally, Ministries of Internal Affairs are mostly police agencies. Their functions and organisation differ significantly from similarly named departments in Western countries, which are usually civil executive bodies headed by politicians and responsible for many other tasks as well as the supervision of law enforcement. The Soviet and successor MVDs have usually been headed by a militsiya general and predominantly consist of service personnel, with civilian employees only filling auxiliary posts. Although such ministers are members of their respective countries' cabinets, they usually do not report to the prime minister or parliament, but only to the president. Local militsiya departments are subordinated to their regional departments, having little accountability to local authorities.

Internal-affairs units within the militsiya itself are usually called "internal security" departments.

The official names of particular militsiya bodies and services in post-Soviet countries are usually very complicated, hence the use of the short term militsiya. Laws usually refer to police just as militsiya.

The short term for a police officer (regardless of gender) is militsioner (Russian: милиционер, Ukrainian: мiлiцiонер). Slang Russian terms for militsioner include ment (plural: менты, menty) and musor (plural: мусора, musora). Although the latter word is offensive (it literally means "trash" or "garbage"), it originated from an acronym for the Moscow Criminal Investigations Department (short for ) in Imperial Russia. Ment is a close equivalent to the English slang term "cop" and derived from the Lwów dialect of Polish
or possibly from the Polish word menda.

The following countries have changed the name of the police force from Militsiya (or equivalent) to a western-style name analogous to "police": Bulgaria, Poland, Romania, Estonia, Lithuania, Moldova, Latvia, Mongolia, North Macedonia, Azerbaijan, Georgia, Serbia, Montenegro, Bosnia and Herzegovina, Croatia, Slovenia, Kazakhstan, Armenia, Turkmenistan, Russia and Ukraine.

In 2019, Uzbekistan officially removed references to the word "Militsiya" from its laws without replacing them with "police".

The police are still called militsiya in Belarus, Tajikistan, Kyrgyzstan, as well as in the unrecognized republics of Abkhazia, South Ossetia and Transnistria. In Kyrgyzstan active discussion continues about renaming the police force from militsiya to police.

General overview

The organizational structure, methods and traditions of the militsiya differ significantly from those of western police. Militsiya as an organisation consists of many functional departments, such as the GIBDD, a traffic police. Organised crime detectives form highly independent squads inside regional militsiya. Some units may have the distinctive names (like OMON in Russia) which are more specific than militsiya or militsioner.

Militsiya personnel ranks mostly follow those of the Army – from private (Rus: ryadovoy), which is the lowest rank, to colonel general – with only these exceptions: there are no ranks of Yefreytor, Army General, or Marshal. Detectives (Russian: operativnik short for operativniy rabotnik) hold a rank of lieutenant at least and could be promoted to major or the lieutenant colonel. The militsiya of an oblast (or other equivalent subnational entity) is usually headed by a general. The rank name is suffixed with of militsiya (e.g. major of militsiya for a major). Militsiya personnel carry firearms, but are not permitted to carry their weapons when they are off duty.

Unlike in some other countries' police agencies, militsioners are not assigned permanent partners, but work alone or within larger groups. Neither uniformed officers nor detectives are allowed to drive police vehicles themselves, so a specialist driver (either a serviceman or a civil employee) is assigned to each car and is also in charge of its maintenance. Under the Patrol Police Service Regulations a designated police officer-driver is required to have a driver licence and is not allowed to abandon the vehicle. However, this refers only to fully marked police vehicles with emergency lights; detectives are allowed to drive civilian cars with are registered to the MVD, having white number plates (marked police vehicles have blue plates) with specific series (for example, o...vo, o...rr, o...mm, o...om). The last two are usually assigned to the vehicles registered to regional level MVD units. The law does not provide any preferences on the road nor allows emergency lights and/or sirens on such vehicles, therefore technically police officers do not have the right to violate traffic laws even while on an assignment. GIBDD (the traffic militsiya) is the only exception: its members drive their own (or even own private) cars and are specially trained in risk-driving.

One unique feature of militsiya policing approach is the system of territorial patronage over citizens. The cities, as well as the rural settlements are divided into uchastoks ("quarters") with a special uchastkovyi militsioner ("quarter policeman"), assigned to each. The main duty of uchastkovyi is to maintain close relations with the residents of his quarter and gather information among them. In particular, uchastkovyi should personally know each and every ex-convict, substance abuser, young hooligan etc. in given uchastok, and visit them regularly for preemptive influence. Uchastkovyi is also responsible for tackling minor offences like family violence, loud noise, residential area parking etc. Uchastkovyi is also the main, and actually the real, militsiya force in remote areas and small settlements where permanent police departments are not created. Uchastkovyi militsioners possess separate small offices within their quarters and maintain citizens admittance in definite weekdays.

This system slightly resembles the US system of sheriffs but shows some notable differences. Uchastkovyi is neither a chief police officer in a given community nor a universal one (not combining detective, incarceration or special tactics tasks).

The system of uchastkovyis dates back to imperial times when uriadniks were conducting lowest-level policing in rural areas. In Soviet Union, uchastkovyis were also responsible for such tasks as maintaining propiska limitations and overseeing former political prisoners, which were subject to daily registration at the local MVD office.

Although women constitute a significant proportion of militsiya staff, they are usually not permitted to fill positions that carry risks (such as patrolman, guard, SWAT), but are allowed to carry firearms for self-defence. Instead, they are widely represented among investigators, juvenile crime inspectors, clerks, etc. However, limited attempts are being made to appoint women as traffic officers or operativniks.

Conscripted police

Another unique militsiya feature is the use of conscripted soldiers from the Internal Troops and special motorized militsiya units (СМЧМ, SMChM) for regular urban policing and for securing various mass events, which required more force employment than usual. The Internal Troops and SMChMs are the gendarmerie-like military force who can be assigned to carry out simple public security tasks like patrolling while being accompanied by professional militsioners, or cordoning large crowds at sport events, concerts, and protests. These soldiers possess no firearms on their policing duties, however they are equipped with PR-73 rubber police batons, PR-90 tonfas and related equipment; when called to perform riot control duties, they are typically equipped with ballistic shields and tear gas. The SMChM soldiers typically wear grey militsiya uniforms, distinguished from commissioned officers by wearing standard-issued sapogi instead of individual boots or shoes, the Internal Troops wear green military uniform. During emergencies, raids, dragnets and other police operations, they are equipped with bullet-proof vests and protective gear, firearms and armoured vehicles while performing their policing duties.

While not on law enforcement duty, soldiers reside in barracks and maintain standard military training. Special motorised militsiya units stationed in the cities were all battalions with three exceptions. Kyiv and Leningrad had regiments and Moscow had a division, known as ODON, which is frequently used for policing Moscow; its soldiers can be spotted by a shoulder patch which features a white panther; other Internal troops units in the Moscow region use a shoulder patch with a white falcon.

Rank insignia
Until late 1936, the People's Militsiya and Internal Troops of the NKVD had no personal ranks, much akin to the Red Army, Red Navy, and OGPU, and used position ranks. When personal ranks were reintroduced in the military in 1935, the Militsiya created a curious rank system that was a blend of standard military ranks such as sergeant, lieutenant, captain and major, and old positional ranks like 'squad leader', 'inspector', and 'director', some with several grades like 'senior' or 'junior'. The collar rank insignia was completely original and not based on military insignia.

This system was largely reused by the GUGB in their special rank structure introduced in 1935, although with new rank insignia and Commissar-style ranks for top officers.

New insignia were issued to GUGB in 1937 and to Militsiya in 1939. It was now based on collar rank patches of the Red Army and Internal Troops. Confusingly, the special NKVD rank system was left intact, so for example 'Captain of Militsiya/State Security was assigned the three-box insignia of an army Colonel (in the Red Army, this patch was reassigned to lieutenant colonel in September 1939, but the NKVD did not alter their insignia) and Major of Militsiya/State Security was mapped to one-romb insignia of Kombrig (a brigade commander) (which was abolished for commanding officers of the Red Army in May 1940). This created a great deal of inconsistency and tension between army and NKVD/NKGB officers.

The NKVD rank system was streamlined in 1943 when imperial-style shoulder boards replaced the collar insignia patches. The ranks now copied those of the Soviet Army, with the exception of top officers starting with 'Senior Major' who were renamed Commissar of Militsiya 3rd, 2nd, and 1st rank, although they still wore army-style Major General, Lieutenant General and Colonel General shoulder boards.

The GUGB/NKGB maintained their commissar ranks until 1945, and switched to equivalent General ranks after that. The Militsiya retained the commissar ranks until 1973.

Some MVD officers had distinct ranks of General of the Internal Service of 1st, 2nd and 3rd rank; they were replaced with Major General, Lieutenant General and Colonel General in the 1970s.

Ranks of militsiya are considered special ranks, not to be confused with military (all-forces) ranks, which are used by the internal troops of the MVD. All militsiya ranks have had the words "of militsiya" at the end, which are part of the rank name and not a descriptive addition.

Soviet militsiya (1945–1990)

Soviet militsiya (1939–1945)

Former Russian militsiya

Former Ukrainian militsiya

Belarusian militsiya

Non-police services
The Soviet and some post-Soviet Ministries of Internal Affairs have also included:

militarized forces ("Internal Troops);
Department of prisons (i.e. GULAG and its successor bodies), if not merged with other ministries or agencies;
Passport and registration service, if not merged with Migration service.

These non-police services should be distinguished from the militsiya itself, except passport and registration service, which structures are often included into OVD and sometimes considered one of the important militsiya services. Their members have always used different generic names and specific ranks (e.g. Major of the Internal Service, rather than Major of Militsiya).

Soviet militsiya (GAI) cars
The most common types were:

Post-Soviet Militsiya forces

Russia

The Russian MVD was recreated as the MVD of the Russian SFSR in 1990, following the restoration of the republican Council of Ministers and Supreme Soviet, and remained when Russia gained independence from the Soviet Union. It controlled the Militsiya, the State Road Inspection Service (GAI), and the Internal Troops. Since the disbanding of the Tax Police, it also investigates economic crimes.

In August 2010, President Dmitry Medvedev introduced new legislation to reform and centralize the funding of the militsiya, as well as to officially change the militsiya's name to "Police" (the term which was used in the Russian Empire). The change was performed on March 1, 2011.

Ukraine

Militsiya was the national police service of Ukraine from the 1950s until 2015. The militsiya was formed whilst Ukraine was governed by the Ukrainian Soviet Socialist Republic, part of the Soviet Union, and continued to serve as a national police service in independent Ukraine until it was replaced by the National Police of Ukraine on 7 November 2015.

Other jurisdictions

The term militsiya remains in use in several parts of the former Soviet Union:

 The Ministry of Internal Affairs of Belarus operates a militsyya, as well as other law-enforcement agencies such as the Presidential Security Service and the State Security Committee (KGB).
 Tajikistan retains the name militsiya, sometime translated as "police".
 The Transdnistrian police force bears the official name PMR militsiya.

Cognate terms also came into use in several Soviet bloc countries during the Cold War. Examples included Bulgaria (Peoples' Militia), Poland (Milicja Obywatelska) and other Warsaw Pact nations, as well as the non-aligned SFR Yugoslavia (Milicija), which was phased out throughout the 1990s and replaced by policija (police) in early 1997. Bulgaria changed the name of its law-enforcement body to Policija in 1991. Romania operated a Miliția, but after the communist regime there fell (1989), the Poliția replaced it in 1990.

See also
ODON of the Internal Troops
OMON
Voluntary People's Druzhina

Notes

References

Further reading
Shelley, Louise I. Policing Soviet Society: The Evolution of State Control. London: Routledge, 1996.

External links

Information from the July 1996 CIA World Factbook
Ministry of the Interior of Russia (official website)

Law enforcement agencies of the Soviet Union
Law enforcement in communist states